The Bust of Costanza Bonarelli is a marble portrait sculpture by the Italian artist Gian Lorenzo Bernini, created in the 1630s. It is now in the Museo Nazionale del Bargello in Florence, Italy. Considered among the most personal of Bernini's work, the bust depicts Costanza Piccolomini Bonarelli, the wife of Matteo Bonarelli, one of Bernini's pupils and coworkers. Bernini fell passionately in love with her. It is an exceptional sculpture in that it breaks with the tradition of seventeenth century portrait sculpturing and previews the style of the next century.

Subject
The subject of the work is Costanza Bonarelli, with whom he fell in love when her husband was working as Bernini's assistant in 1636. Later, Bernini discovered his brother had also been having a vigorous affair with Costanza. This created tension and led to Bernini assaulting his brother and ordering a slave to harm Costanza (leading to a deep scar on the side of her face), which led Pope Urban VIII to intervene. He advised Bernini to get married, which he did, in 1639, to Caterina Tezio. Their marriage lasted 34 years and produced 11 children. Bernini would remain professional and increasingly religious to the last, when another Pope blessed him on his deathbed.

Theme
Bernini's theme in Bust of Costanza Bonarelli is the vitality of power. Bernini's aesthetic is centred on the power of sex, later epitomized in the Ecstasy of Saint Teresa (1647–1652). For Bernini, Costanza is an angel that fills him with ecstasy.

Distinguishing features
The Bust of Costanza Bonarelli invites such anachronistic descriptions as impressionist, romantic, and rococo. It has been described as being "light as air". Jonathan Jones wrote:

See also
List of works by Gian Lorenzo Bernini

References

External links
 Web Gallery of Art

Busts by Gian Lorenzo Bernini
1630s sculptures
Marble sculptures in Italy
Busts in Italy
Sculptures of the Bargello